The 2019 Christchurch mayoral election was part of the New Zealand local elections on 12 October 2019.

Candidates

Confirmed
Blair Anderson (Another Mildgreen Initiative), perennial candidate and former deputy leader of the Aotearoa Legalise Cannabis Party
J T Anderson
Lianne Dalziel (Best for Christchurch), incumbent mayor
Jim Glass (Independent)
Tubby Hansen (Economic Euthenic's), perennial candidate who first stood in 1971
Robin McCarthy (Independent)
Stephen McPaike, social housing tenant
Sam Park
John Minto (Keep Our Assets Canterbury), activist and 2016 candidate
Darryll Park (Independent Move Otautahi Christchurch Forward), hospitality business proprietor
Adrian-Cosmin Schönborn (Independent), telecommunications technician
Peter Wakeman (STOP Trashing Our Planet)
Aaron White (Independent)

Declined
Nicky Wagner, Christchurch-based National Party MP

Results

References

Mayoral elections in Christchurch
2019 elections in New Zealand
Politics of Christchurch
2010s in Christchurch
October 2019 events in New Zealand